The 25th Los Angeles Film Critics Association Awards, honoring the best in film for 1999, were announced on December 11, 1999 and awarded on January 19, 2000.

Winners
Best Picture:
The Insider
Runner-up: American Beauty
Best Director:
Sam Mendes – American Beauty
Runner-up: Michael Mann – The Insider
Best Actor:
Russell Crowe – The Insider
Runner-up: Richard Farnsworth – The Straight Story
Best Actress:
Hilary Swank – Boys Don't Cry
Runner-up: Reese Witherspoon – Election
Best Supporting Actor:
Christopher Plummer – The Insider
Runner-up: John Malkovich – Being John Malkovich
Best Supporting Actress:
Chloë Sevigny – Boys Don't Cry
Runner-up: Samantha Morton – Sweet and Lowdown
Best Screenplay:
Charlie Kaufman – Being John Malkovich
Runner-up: Alan Ball – American Beauty
Best Cinematography:
Dante Spinotti – The Insider
Runner-up: Conrad L. Hall – American Beauty
Best Production Design:
Rick Heinrichs – Sleepy Hollow
Runner-up: Dante Ferretti – Titus
Best Music Score:
Trey Parker and Marc Shaiman – South Park: Bigger, Longer & Uncut
Runner-up: Gabriel Yared – The Talented Mr. Ripley
Best Foreign-Language Film:
All About My Mother (Todo sobre mi madre) • Spain
Runner-up: The Dreamlife of Angels (La vie rêvée des anges) • France
Best Non-Fiction Film:
Buena Vista Social Club
Runner-up: Mr. Death: The Rise and Fall of Fred A. Leuchter, Jr.
Best Animation:
The Iron Giant
The Douglas Edwards Experimental/Independent Film/Video Award:
Owen Land
New Generation Award:
Alexander Payne and Jim Taylor – Citizen Ruth and Election
Career Achievement Award:
Dede Allen
Special Citation:
Rick Schmidlin, Roger Mayer, and Turner Classic Movies for their meticulous reconstruction and promotion of Erich von Stroheim's Greed

References

External links
 25th Annual Los Angeles Film Critics Association Awards

1999
Los Angeles Film Critics Association Awards
Los Angeles Film Critics Association Awards
Los Angeles Film Critics Association Awards
Los Angeles Film Critics Association Awards